Helianthella microcephala, common name purpledisk helianthella, is a North American plant species in the family Asteraceae. It grows in the southwestern United States, in the states of Arizona, New Mexico, Colorado, and Utah.

The plant usually produces 3-15 yellow flower heads per stem, in a flat-topped array. Each head contains 5-13 yellow ray flowers surrounding numerous dark brown or dark purple (almost black) disc flowers.

References

External links

microcephala
Flora of the Southwestern United States
Plants described in 1873